Ocean Adventure is an open-space marine zoological park in the Morong, Bataan portion of the Subic Special Economic and Freeport Zone in the Philippines.

History
Ocean Adventure opened to the public in October 2001 with its initial facilities built at a cost of $7.5 million. The marine facility was built at Camayan Point which formerly hosted a ammunition pier.

In its first year of operations, false killer whale viewing and sea lion shows were among the marine park's attractions.

A dispute has been ongoing between the SBME and the SBMA since the early 2010s. The latter terminated its lease contract with the former alleging that SBME violated terms of its lease agreement; violations cited are illegal subleasing of property, constructing without permits, improper waste storage, and closure of public roads. It began when the SBME developed "The Hill", a residential area populated with expatriates.

In 2017, the marine park was named Best Theme Park in the inaugural edition of the United Stars Events and Exhibitions Corp.-organized Philippine Tourism Industry Awards in 2017.

The SBMA seized undeveloped portions of land owned by SBME, including land meant for future development of Ocean Adventure in October 2019. The SBMA sought to repossess Ocean Adventure in 2019, citing multiple contractual violations and failure to complete developmental commitments and asked the SBME to reduce activities within two years.

Operations seized for seven months in 2020, due to the COVID-19 pandemic. Ocean Adventure resumed operations in October 2020.

Facilities and attractions

Ocean Adventure is managed by Subic Bay Marine Exploratorium, Inc which is a locator in the Subic Special Economic and Freeport Zone and also runs the Camayan Beach Resort and the Adventure Beach Waterpark. The marine park itself is located within the West Ilanin Forest Area which is in the town of Morong, Bataan portion of the Subic economic zone. The marine park has three primary attractions namely the Sea Lion Show, Whale Presentation and the Discovery Aquarium.

Visitors
According to data from the Subic Bay Metropolitan Authority in 2012, the marine park receives 500,000 visitors annually making Ocean Adventure among the top tourist destinations in the Central Luzon region.

References

2001 establishments in the Philippines
Aquaria in the Philippines
Marine parks of the Philippines
Tourist attractions in Bataan
Buildings and structures in Bataan
Subic Special Economic and Freeport Zone